Sarkuh may refer to:
 Sarkuh, Hormozgan
 Sarkuh-e Shahid Deli Bajak, Kohgiluyeh and Boyer-Ahmad Province